Yaguachi is a town in the Guayas province of Ecuador.

The town is best known for its cheese, thought to be made from a special breed of goat that can only survive in the exact climate of this region.

Sources 
 www.inec.gov.ec

Populated places in Guayas Province